Black Symphony is a live album, DVD and Blu-ray Disc from Dutch symphonic metal band Within Temptation. It was released worldwide on September 22–24, 2008 and is available on 2-disc DVD, 2-disc CD, and Blu-ray. Sony Poland announced this item to be released on 3LP. Release is due Friday 28 December 2018.

Information 
The release consists of two discs. The first one contains the homonymous special concert that features the band accompanied by The Metropole Orchestra, the Pa'dam Choir, and special guests including George Oosthoek (ex-Orphanage), Anneke van Giersbergen of Agua de Annique and Mina Caputo of Life of Agony. It was filmed by 14 HD cameras on February 7, 2008 in a sold out concert at the Ahoy Arena in Rotterdam. The album was certified Gold in the Netherlands. Besides the orchestra, choirs and special guests, the concert featured some elaborate extra production apart from the band's common tour performances, such as choreographed circus performances, pyrotechnics, fireworks and special lightning. The album was also one of the pioneers of the blu-ray format release. Music technology magazine Sound on Sound constructed a special article about the making-of process of the DVD, such as the mixing and the editing, and the use of new technology in it.

Reception

The double release was well received among music critics. Adrien Begrand, from Popmatters, praised the band's current recognition in Europe and considered that the main concert structure and production was a worthy opportunity that only a few successful bands could embrace. Begrand, while praising den Adel's performance overall, considered the excess of ballads on the setlist as a low point. He ended his review stating that the release is "in all, a classy package befitting a very classy band, and a sure-fire fan pleaser."

Content

DVD 1

Within Temptation & Metropole Orchestra: Black Symphony.
Recorded live at The Ahoy, Rotterdam, Netherlands on February 7, 2008.

Extras

DVD 2

Bonus Concert
Recorded live at The Beursgebouw, Eindhoven, Netherlands on November 24, 2007.

Music Videos

Specs 
PAL/NTSC format. Contains Dolby Digital 2.0, 5.1 and DTS 96/24 surround sound, filmed in high definition, widescreen. Subtitled in English. Coded region-free, with a total running time of 470 minutes as it also contains both CDs of the Ahoy concert.

CD track listing

Europe and Japanese version

The iTunes, amazon.com (MP3), Rhapsody, and Zune Marketplace versions of Black Symphony include all 22 songs.

Editions
Europe: 2-CD Digipack/ 2-DVD Digipack/ 2-Disc Blu-ray
Europe, UK, Australia: 4-Disc Special Edition Digipack
USA, Canada: 1-CD+1-DVD Jewelcase
Japan: 2-CD+1-DVD Digipack
Argentina: 1-DVD

Personnel

The Band
Sharon den Adel – vocals
Robert Westerholt – rhythm guitar, growls 
Ruud Jolie – lead guitar
Martijn Spierenburg – keyboards
Jeroen van Veen – bass guitar
Stephen van Haestregt – drums

Special Guests
Mina Caputo – featured vocals on "What Have You Done"
Anneke van Giersbergen – featured vocals on "Somewhere"
George Oosthoek – featured growls on "The Other Half (Of Me)"

Charts

Album Charts

Year-end album charts

DVD Charts

Year-end DVD charts

Certifications

!scope="col" colspan="3" | DVD
|-

References

External links

Black Symphony English Subtitle: http://dl.opensubtitles.org/en/download/sub/4153466

Within Temptation albums
2008 live albums
2008 video albums
Live video albums
GUN Records live albums
GUN Records video albums
Sony BMG video albums